Saint Louis is an administrative district of Seychelles located on the island of Mahé. It is the smallest district of Seychelles with an area slightly more than a square kilometer.

References

Districts of Seychelles
Victoria, Seychelles